Dan Siegel (born in Seattle, Washington) is a pianist, composer, and record producer. His earlier music has been described as new age, while his more recent work has been called contemporary jazz.

Music career
Siegel was born in Seattle, Washington and raised in Eugene, Oregon. When he was eight, he began piano lessons, and at 12 he was performing professionally in a rock band. He went to the Berklee College of Music in Boston, then the University of Oregon. After college, he started recording his own compositions. He signed with the jazz record label Inner City Records and recorded his first album, Nite Ride (1980). His second album, The Hot Spot (1982), reached the top ten of the jazz chart in Billboard magazine.

He moved to Los Angeles and composed music for movies and television. In 1986 he signed with Epic Records and released a series of smooth jazz albums.

In parallel he produced and recorded three albums with the fusion/mainstream band Birds of a Feather—Birds of a Feather, Above the Clouds, and Stand Together—and released the self-titled album by the band Future Prospect.

Television and film work
Siegel's work as a television and film composer includes the score for the film Reform School Girls (1986), and Universal Studios TV series, Hard Copy (1987). He has also worked as musical director and conductor on the late night CBS TV show, Overtime... with Pat O'Brien (1990). He has played on numerous TV and film projects as a session player, including the Oscar-winning film The Usual Suspects. His music was also featured on the Weather Channel's Local Forecast segments from 1986 to 1991.

Discography

Studio albums
 1980 Nite Ride (Inner City)
 1981 The Hot Shot (Inner City)
 1981 Oasis (Inner City)
 1982 Dan Siegel (Elektra)
 1983 Reflections (Epic)
 1984 Another Time, Another Place (Epic)
 1985 On the Edge (Epic)
 1986 Short Stories (Epic)
 1987 Northern Nights (Columbia)
 1989 Late One Night (Epic)
 1991 Going Home (Epic)
 1993 The Getaway (Sin-Drome)
 1995 Hemispheres (Sunset Boulevard)
 1998 Clairvoyance (Countdown)
 2001 Key of Joy (Pony Canyon)
 2004 Inside Out (Native Language)
 2006 Departure (Native Language)
 2008 Fables (Native Language)
 2009 Sphere (DSM), also available as Sphere Triple Deluxe, a 3-CD set containing additionally to Sphere the 2 albums Fables and Departure
 2014 Indigo (DSM)
 2018 Origins (DSM)
 2021 Faraway Place (DSM)

Compilation albums
 2000 Along The Way, The Best of Dan Siegel (Sony) (includes 1 new song - From the Heart)
 2016 The Inner City Years, a 3-CD set containing the albums Nite Ride, The Hot Shot and Oasis

with Birds of a Feather 

 1987 Birds of A Feather (Optimism)
 1994 Above the Clouds (Brainchild)
 1996 Stand Together (Playful)

with Future Prospect 

 1987 Future Prospect (Optimism)

References

External links
Official site
 All Music

 Jazz da Gama

American jazz pianists
American male pianists
Smooth jazz pianists
Living people
Musicians from Seattle
Musicians from Eugene, Oregon
University of Oregon alumni
Pausa Records artists
Inner City Records artists
South Eugene High School alumni
21st-century American pianists
21st-century American male musicians
American male jazz musicians
Year of birth missing (living people)
Native Language Music artists
Pony Canyon artists
Businesspeople from Eugene, Oregon